Mount Glendowan is a summit in Alberta, Canada. Its name comes from the Glendowan Mountains, in Ireland.

References

Glendowan
Alberta's Rockies